Vempalli Gangadhar is a writer from Kadapa district of Andhra Pradesh. He has been awarded Sahitya Akademi's Yuva Puraskar for 2011 for his short-story collection "Molakala Punnami".

Gangadhar, recipient of Central Sahitya Academy's first Yuva Puraskar, had been a guest of the President in Rashtrapathi Bhavan from 8 to 26 September 2014.

Writings

Molakala Punnami
Gangadhar's award-winning book Molakala Punnami is a collection of 13 short-stories. It was published in 2006 and is woven around the plight of farmers. Gunturu Seshendra Sarma, a Telugu poet, has written the foreword for the book.

Other works
Gangadhar, a doctorate holder from the Sri Venkateswara University, has ten books to his name so far. He has also won an award for a previous work. His Mynapu Bommalu won the American Telugu Association award. The book is about sex workers.

Published books

 Depamanu (Telugu Literature Articles) దీపమాను(సాహిత్య వ్యాసాలు) June 2020
 Matti porala madhya maha charithra (History articles) మట్టి పొరల మధ్య మహా చరిత్ర (చరిత్ర వ్యాసాలు) June 2020
 C.P.Brown series of Letters సి.పి. బ్రౌన్ కు మనమేం చేశాం? (సంపాదకత్వం) (book editor) May 2020
 Urenium palle (Novel) (యురేనియం పల్లె) July 2019
 Erra chandanam Dari lo Tamila Kulilu (Red Sanders Tamil woodcutters) (ఎర్రచందనం దారిలో తమిళకూలీలు) May 2019
 Anathapuram Charithra అనంత పురం చరిత్ర (సంపాదకత్వం) (book editor) January 2017
 Ravana Vahanam Kathalu (Ravana Vahanam - 25 stories) రావణ వాహనం కథలు  December 2015
 Paapagni kathalu (Stories of the Paapagni River - 30 Stories) పాపాఘ్ని కథలు June 2015
 Nenu Chusina shantinekethan నేను చూసిన  శాంతినికేతన్ (పర్యటన)(Travelogue) January 2015
 Toli telugu shasanam (The first Telugu stone inscription) తొలి తెలుగు శాసనం December 2013
 Greeshma Bhoomi Kathalu (Stories of the summer land - 13 Stories) గ్రీష్మ భూమి కథలు November 2013
 Nela digina vaana (The rain that landed on earth - Novel) నేల దిగిన వాన March 2013
 Devarashila (The divine rock - 12 Stories) దేవరశిల November 2008
 Hiranya rajyam (The kingdom of Hirnya - Rayalaseema factionism history) హిరణ్య రాజ్యం August 2008
 Pune prayanam (The journey to Pune - Trafficking of Women) పూణే ప్రయాణం June 2007
 Molakala punnami (The full moon of sprouts - 13 Stories) మొలకల పున్నమి April 2006; second edition April 2012
 Kadapa Vibhavam కడప వైభవం-కడప చరిత్ర (సంపాదకత్వం)(book editor) 2004
 Kathanam (narration - essays book) కథనం November 2002

 Novels
 Nela digina vaana నేల దిగిన వాన (The rain that landed on earth)
 Urenium palle యురేనియం పల్లె (Novel)

 Short stories
 Agra Tonga - ఆగ్రా టాంగా (What is to be really seen in Agra?)
 Hamsa Nattu - హంస నత్తు (We finally reach where we are destined to reach)
 Edari Oda - ఎడారి ఓడ'' (What is wrong when done with greed can be right when done in need)

Awards
 A.P. cultural council Award in literary criticism 1999
 A.P.cultural council Award in media writing 2001
 A.P.cultural council Award in play writing 2003
 Cuddapah district kadapothsavalu souvenir co-ordinatior Award 2003
 Republic day district best writer Award 2003
 Katha – New Delhi, Telugu story National Award 2003
 Republic day District best story writer Award 2004
 Cuddapah District kadapothsavalu souvenir co-ordinator Award 2004
 ATA (American Telugu Association) Story Award 2004
 Cuddapah District kadapothsavalu Souvenir co-ordinator Award 2005
 Republic day district best media writer Award 2005
 Kadapa 200 years festival publicity co-ordinator Award 2007
 Vipula – Telugu magazine story Award 2007
 R.S. Krishna Murthy foundation Award 2007
 Teja news weekly first Telugu story Award 2008
 Gurajada appa rao Sahithi Puraskaram 2008
 Sahithya netram Telugu Story Award 2008
 Vishala Sahiti’ B.S. Ramulu Katha Puraskaram 2009
 Hasan fathima Sahiti puraskaram (prakasam dist) 2010
 Acharya Diwakarla Venkata avadhani centenary Puraskar: 2011
 Sahitya Academi yuva Puraskar ; 2011
 World Telugu Conference – Sahiti Puraskar: 2012
 Bangalore Literature Festival Telugu story award ; 2013
 Ampasayya Naveen Navala puraskaram  ; 2013
 Ravuri Bhardwaja sahiti puraskaram  ;2014
 Dr Vasireddy sestha Devi katha puraskaram  ;2014
 Dhrbhaka Subramanyam sahitya puraskaram  ;2015
 Andhra kesari yuva jana cheythanya puraskaram ;2015

Seminars
 Kendra Sahithya Academi Seminar (Tirupathi) 2010
 Kendra Sahithya Academi Seminar (Dharwad) 2011
 Kendra Sahithya Academi Writers Travel Grant Prog. 27 April to 7 May 2011
 Rashtapati Bhavan -in residence programme; 8 to 26 September 2014

References

Telugu writers
Sri Venkateswara University alumni
Living people
Year of birth missing (living people)
Recipients of the Sahitya Akademi Yuva Puraskar